Charlie's Angels is an American media franchise created by Ivan Goff and Ben Roberts and owned by Sony Pictures Entertainment, which began with the original television series of the same name. The franchise follow the adventures of the Angels, a team of women working for the Townsend Agency, a private secret agent agency, under the leadership of Charlie Townsend, their unseen boss.

The original television series enjoyed huge popularity with audiences and was a top ten hit in the Nielsen ratings for its first two seasons. Following its cancellation in 1981, the series continues to have a 1970s American cult and pop culture following through syndication and DVD releases. A numerous variety of merchandise were produced, including dolls, a toy line, board games, beauty products, several sets of trading cards and a comic book series by Dynamite Entertainment.

A film series was launched in 2000. Taking place after the events of the original series, the films are a continuation of the story with later generations of Angels. The films receive mixed reviews from critics and have grossed a total of $596 million, against a combined budget of $261 million.

The franchise was rebooted in 2011 with a television series of the same name, which was canceled after seven episodes. Following the cancellation, a third film was produced which restored the original timeline of the franchise.

Television

Charlie's Angels (1976–1981)

Sabrina Duncan, Jill Munroe, and Kelly Garrett have graduated from the police academy in Los Angeles, California. Despite proving their capability during training, all three have subsequently been assigned to be a meter maid, office worker, and crossing guard, respectively. Dissatisfied with these jobs, they are recruited to work for the Charles Townsend Agency as private investigators.

Their boss, Charlie Townsend, who nicknames them "Angels", is never viewed full-face. Charlie gives the Angels and his associate John Bosley their assignments via a speakerphone; he never met them face-to-face.

Attempted spin-off
ABC attempted to create a spin-off of Charlie's Angels in 1980 called Toni's Boys. The backdoor pilot aired near the end of season four, simply titled "Toni's Boys" (season 4, episode 23). The episode starred Barbara Stanwyck as Antonia "Toni" Blake, a wealthy widow socialite and friend of Charlie's who ran a detective agency that she inherited from her late husband. The agency was staffed by three handsome male detectives—Cotton Harper (Stephen Shortridge), Bob Sorensen (Bob Seagren), and Matt Parrish (Bruce Bauer)—who took direction from Toni, and solved crimes in a manner similar to the Angels. The show was not picked up as a regular series for the following season.

Charlie's Angels (2011)

Kate Prince, a former Miami cop; Eve French, a former street racer; and Abby Simpson, a former thief; are recruited to work for the Townsend Agency in Miami as private investigators. Aided by John Bosley, a former hacker, they fight crime under the leadership of Charlie Townsend, their unseen boss.

The series served as a reboot of the franchise and was cancelled after only one season with seven episodes.

Crossover
Note: The table below only accounts for full crossover events, single guest appearances are not included.

With other series

Films
Launched in 2000, the Charlie's Angels film series is a continuation of the original television series story.

Charlie's Angels (2000)

Natalie Cook, Dylan Sanders and Alex Munday are the second generation of "Angels", a crime-fighting trio who are the masters of disguise, espionage and martial arts. Charlie assigns them to find Eric Knox, a software genius who created a revolutionary voice-recognition system and heads his own company, Knox Enterprises. Knox is believed to have been kidnapped by Roger Corwin, who runs a communications-satellite company called Redstar. The "Angels", aided by Bosley, set out to bring down the bad guys.

Charlie's Angels: Full Throttle (2003)

Natalie, Dylan and Alex, together with Bosley's adoptive brother Jimmy Bosley, are sent to recover H.A.L.O. titanium rings stolen from the United States Department of Justice which can display the people listed in the witness protection program. During this adventure, they will cross paths with former Angel Madison Lee.

Charlie's Angels (2019)

The Townsend agency has expanded internationally with multiple teams of Angels guided by multiple Bosleys, a rank named after John. The European division of the agency is informed that Elena Houghlin, an engineer, wants to expose her superiors for covering up a discovery about how an energy conservation device that she helped invent, named Calisto, has the potential to trigger fatal seizures when used. A new team of Angels are called into action to protect the world from Calisto.

Future
Following the release of Full Throttle, the franchise was confirmed for a third and fourth film, but in 2004, the idea was cancelled. In 2019, a sequel to the 2019 film was discussed, but due to the film's box office performance, the sequel was scrapped.

Short film

Ru's Angels (2019)
A three minute short action comedy film titled Ru's Angels, follows three drag queens Alaska, Peppermint and Nina West from RuPaul's Drag Race, who are about to stop a wig snatcher played by Katya. The short film also stars RuPaul as Bos-Slay and the cast of the 2019 Charlie's Angels film.

Web series

Charlie's Angels: Animated Adventures (2003)
Charlie's Angels: Animated Adventures is an animated prequel web series consisting of six episodes. The series follows the Angels on a mission to find U.S. Marshal Ray Carter. Carter was kidnapped, and taken to and incarcerated in Mongolia, leading to the events of Charlie's Angels: Full Throttle.

Cast and crew

Principal cast

 A  indicates the actor or actress lent only their voice for their film character.
 A  indicates the actor portrayed the role of a younger version of the character.
 A  indicates the actor appeared as their character through a photographic still.
 A  indicates a cameo appearance.
 A dark gray cell indicates the character was not in the film.

Additional crew

Reception

Box office performance

Critical and public response

Music

Film soundtracks

Singles

Other media and merchandising

Collectible items
During the original series' run, Hasbro Industries produced an extensive range of Charlie's Angels merchandise, which was distributed in the US, the UK, and other international markets. A numerous variety of collectible items were produced, including two versions of dolls, boardgames, numerous posters, several sets of trading cards, notebooks, a lunchbox and thermos set, a Charlie's Angels toy van, children's beauty products and even record albums. Author Sherrie A. Inness, in the text 'Disco Divas: Women and Popular Culture in the 1970s' writes that "Charlie's Angels merchandise was big business, Hasbro Industries spent over $2.5 million to advertise its Charlie's  Angels dolls".

In the UK, as was common with many popular US programs of the era, a series of tie-in hardcover annuals were published by World International Publishing Ltd, containing stories, comics, photos, puzzles and features on the stars. There are four Charlie's Angels annuals in total.

Although it was not connected to the show, a 1976 poster of Farrah Fawcett sporting a red bathing suit became the biggest selling poster in history with more than 12 million copies sold. This poster also helped the burgeoning popularity of the series. The red swimsuit that helped make Farrah Fawcett a 1970s icon became part of the Smithsonian's collection in 2011. The picture has been immortalized as a Black Label Barbie Collection doll and the legendary red bathing suit has been donated to the Smithsonian Institution in Washington, D.C. The designer of that swimsuit is Norma Kamali.

Collectible card game

Video games
In July 2003, three Charlie's Angels games were released on three different gaming platforms: Nintendo GameCube, PlayStation 2, and the mobile phone. The versions released on the GameCube and PlayStation 2 were virtually the same and were both titled Charlie's Angels. The version released for the mobile phone was modified to fit the technical restrictions of the platform, and was titled Charlie's Angels: Road Cyclone. An online video game named Charlie's Angels: Angel X was also released in May 2003 by Sony Pictures Digital Networks. The three games are based on the first and second films in the series.

In April 2008, Ojom announced a new Charlie's Angels mobile phone game entitled Charlie's Angels: Hellfire. The game was available on operator portals across Europe.

In August 2019, a game named Charlie's Angels: The Game was released on iOS and Android devices by Crazy Labs Games. The game is an endless runner based on the third film in the series.

Comic books
Two British comic strip versions were produced. The first appeared in the Polystyle publication Target in April 1978, drawn by John Canning. Target was a sister title to the long-running TV Comic aimed at older children and featuring TV action and crime shows of the day. Proving unpopular, it folded in August and merged back into TV Comic where Canning's Angels strip continued until October 1979. The second strip was printed in Junior TV Times Look-in, debuting in November 1979 (as soon as Polystyle's deal expired), written by Angus Allan and drawn by Jim Baikie and Bill Titcombe.

In June 2018, a six-issue limited comic book series based on the television series was launched by Dynamite Entertainment. A crossover comic book series with Charlie's Angels and The Bionic Woman titled Charlie's Angels vs. the Bionic Woman, was released on July 3, 2019.

References

 
American film series
Action film franchises
Television franchises
Mass media franchises introduced in 1976
Film series introduced in 2000
Columbia Pictures franchises
Female superheroes
Sony Pictures franchises